Rihanna (born 1988) is a Barbadian singer.

Rihanna or Rihana may also refer to:
 Rihanna (given name)
 Rihanna (book), a book by Rihanna and Simon Henwood
 "Rihanna" (Orezi song) (2013)
 "Rihanna" (Yxng Bane song) (2017)
 "Rihanna", a 2014 song by Clean Bandit from New Eyes
 "Rihanna", a song by Yo Gotti featuring Young Thug
 Demonym for a female Romulan, in Star Trek novels by Diane Duane, or in continuity with her work.
 Rihana, Hama, a village in Syria
 Sami Rihana (born 1941), Lebanese army officer and historian

See also 
 Rhianna, given name
 Rhiannon (disambiguation)
 Riana (disambiguation)